Robert Easton Burns (December 26, 1805 – January 12, 1863) was a Canadian lawyer, judge, and Chancellor of the University of Toronto.

Born in Niagara (Niagara-on-the-Lake), Upper Canada, the son of the Reverend John and Jane Burns, Burns was educated at home and at the Niagara District Grammar School. A lawyer, he was also a puisne judge on the Court of Queen's Bench from 1850 until his death in 1863. From 1857 to 1861, he was the Chancellor of the University of Toronto.  From 1849 to 1850, he was the treasurer of the Law Society of Upper Canada.

References
 

1805 births
1863 deaths
Chancellors of the University of Toronto
Judges in Ontario
Lawyers in Ontario
People from Niagara-on-the-Lake
Pre-Confederation Ontario people
Province of Canada judges